Mehamn Church is a parish church of the Church of Norway in Gamvik Municipality in Troms og Finnmark county, Norway. It is located in the village of Mehamn. It is one of the churches for the Gamvik parish which is part of the Hammerfest prosti (deanery) in the Diocese of Nord-Hålogaland. The white, concrete church was built in a long church style in 1965 using plans drawn up by the architect Hans Magnus. The church seats about 200 people.

Media gallery

See also
List of churches in Nord-Hålogaland

References

Gamvik
Churches in Finnmark
20th-century Church of Norway church buildings
Churches completed in 1965
1965 establishments in Norway
Long churches in Norway
Concrete churches in Norway